The Museum of Primitive Art is a now defunct museum devoted to the early arts of the indigenous cultures of Africa, the Americas, Asia, Europe and  Oceania.  It was founded in 1954 by Nelson Rockefeller, who donated his own collection of Tribal art. The museum opened to the public in 1957 in a townhouse at 15 West 54th Street in New York City. Robert Goldwater (1907–1973) was the museum’s first director.  The museum closed in 1976, and its collections were transferred to the Metropolitan Museum of Art.

References
 Lowman, Cherry, Displays of Power: Art and War among the Marings of New Guinea, New York, Museum of Primitive Art, 1973.
 Mead, Margaret, Technique & personality, New York, Museum of Primitive Art, 1963.
 Metropolitan Museum of Art, Art of Oceania, Africa and the Americas from the Museum of Primitive Art: student preparation materials, New York, Metropolitan Museum of Art, 1969.
 Museum of Primitive Art, Rituals of Euphoria: Coca in South America; 6 March to 8 September 1974, New York, Museum of Primitive Art, 1974.
 Museum of Primitive Art, Art of Oceania, Africa, and the Americas, from the Museum of Primitive Art, New York, Metropolitan Museum of Art, 1969.
 Museum of Primitive Art, The Great Bieri, New York, Museum of Primitive Art, 1962.
 Museum of Primitive Art, Masterpieces in the Museum of Primitive Art: Africa, Oceania, North America, Mexico, Central to South America, Peru, New York, Museum of Primitive Art, 1965.
 Museum of Primitive Art, Primitive Art Masterworks, New York, American Federation of Arts, 1974.
 Museum of Primitive Art, Sculpture from Mexico Selected from the Collection of the Museum of Primitive Art, New York, Museum of Primitive Art, 1964.
 Museum of Primitive Art, Sculpture from Peru Selected from the Collection of the Museum of Primitive Art, New York, Museum of Primitive Art, 1964.
 Museum of Primitive Art, Sculpture from the South Seas in the Collection of the Museum of Primitive Art'', New York, Museum of Primitive Art, 1962.
 Museum of Primitive Art, Selected Works from the Collection, New York, The Museum of Primitive Art, 1957.
 Museum of Primitive Art, Traditional Art of the African Nations in the Museum of Primitive Art, New York, Museum of Primitive Art, 1961.
 Museum of Primitive Art, Sculpture from Africa in the Collection of the Museum of Primitive Art, New York, Museum of Primitive Art, 1963.
 Newton, Douglas, Malu Openwork Boards of the Tshuosh Tribe, New York, Museum of Primitive Art, 1963.
 Newton, Douglas, New Guinea Art in the Collection of the Museum of Primitive Art, New York, Museum of Primitive Art, 1967.

External links
Museum of Primitive Art catalogs, fully digitized and available through The Metropolitan Museum of Art Libraries

Footnotes

Museums in Manhattan
Defunct art museums and galleries in Manhattan
Defunct art museums and galleries in the United States
Tribal art
Art museums established in 1957
Art museums disestablished in 1976
1957 establishments in New York City
1976 disestablishments in New York (state)
Metropolitan Museum of Art